Sky were an English/Australian instrumental rock group that specialised in combining a variety of musical styles, most prominently rock, classical and jazz. The group's original and best-known line-up featured classical guitarist John Williams (Australian), bass player Herbie Flowers, electric guitarist Kevin Peek (Australian), drummer Tristan Fry and keyboard player Francis Monkman.

History

Roots and prehistory

In 1971, John Williams released the fusion album Changes, his first recording of non-classical music and the first on which he played electric guitar. Among the musicians working on the album were Tristan Fry (an established session drummer who was also the timpanist for the Royal Philharmonic Orchestra and the Academy of St. Martin in the Fields, and had played Timpani on the Beatles' "A Day in the Life") and Herbie Flowers (a former member of Blue Mink and T. Rex, as well as a busy session musician who, among other things, had recorded the bassline for Lou Reed's "Walk on the Wild Side").

The three musicians became friends, kept in touch and continued working together on various projects during the 1970s. One of these was Williams' 1978 album Travelling, another substantially commercially successful cross-genre recording. As well as Fry and Flowers, the record featured former Curved Air member Francis Monkman (who in addition to his progressive and psychedelic rock background as guitar and synthesiser player, was a trained and accomplished classical harpsichordist).

In 1979, Monkman performed on Louis Clark's album (per-spek-tiv) n., on which he collaborated with Australian session guitarist Kevin Peek. Peek was a musician equally adept at classical guitar and pop/rock styles, having built a reputation both as a chamber musician and as a long-standing member of Cliff Richard's band, as well as for working with Manfred Mann, Lulu, Tom Jones, Jeff Wayne, Shirley Bassey and Gary Glitter.

First line-up: 1979–1980

The success of Travelling inspired Williams and Flowers to set up Sky, their own long-term cross-genre band. The band name Sky was suggested by flautist Pinuccia Rossetti, a member of the Carlos Bonell Ensemble, and a friend of Williams.  Fry and Monkman were swiftly recruited, with Kevin Peek being the final addition. The band began writing and recording instrumental music drawing on their collective experience of classical, light pop, progressive and psychedelic rock, light entertainment and jazz. After a protracted search for a record company, Sky signed with the small European label Ariola Records.

Although Sky was run democratically (with all members contributing music and/or arrangements), the presence of John Williams in the line-up was regarded as the band's biggest selling point and was emphasised in publicity. Williams' concurrent solo instrumental hit – "Cavatina – Theme from The Deer Hunter" – also helped to raise the band's profile. However, this selling was counterbalanced by some negative reviews from critics accustomed to Williams' classical performances, who remained unimpressed by his new direction with Sky.

Sky's self-titled debut album (released in 1979) was highly successful in Britain and Australia, quickly reaching gold record status and eventually topping out as a platinum record. The album featured versions of Eric Satie's "Gymnopedie No. 1" and Antonio Ruiz-Pipò's "Danza", as well as original compositions by Monkman and Flowers. Monkman's 'Cannonball' was a minor hit single, and the keyboard player also contributed the twenty-minute second-side composition "Where Opposites Meet" (intended to combine and display the band's diverse influences). The band toured the UK in summer and autumn 1979, particular triumphs being sold-out concerts at the Royal Albert Hall and the Dominion Theatre in London (the latter a five-night sellout).

In 1980, Sky recorded and released their second album, Sky 2. This was a double album that built upon its predecessor's success, becoming the tenth highest selling album in Britain that year. The album included Monkman's side-long rock suite "FIFO" (a piece inspired by computer information processing techniques, stands for "First In, First Out") and four classical pieces including three established chamber music pieces (played entirely straight) and the band's souped-up electric treatment of Bach's "Toccata and Fugue in D Minor". The latter was released as a single (under the name "Toccata") and reached number 5 in the national pop charts, giving the band the opportunity of performing on Top of the Pops. Other tracks included a Williams conflation of Spanish folk tunes, a Fry-penned tuned percussion piece, a cover of Curved Air's "Vivaldi", Peek's Arabic-influenced "Sahara", the psychedelic faux-Spanish folk dance "Hotta", and several cheerful Flowers compositions including his tuba showcase "Tuba Smarties" and "Scipio" (which Flowers described as "the first piece of music to have Parts I & II running simultaneously.").

In 1980, the BBC produced the television series Great Railway Journeys of the World which included an episode set in Australia. The music for this programme was by Sky, featuring tracks from the first two albums.

Following further tours of Australia and the UK, Francis Monkman left the band in 1980 to concentrate on his own projects (having scored success with his soundtrack to the film The Long Good Friday). The split was entirely amicable, and the band had no doubts about carrying on despite the fact that Monkman had been Sky's most prominent original composer and arranger.

Second line-up: 1980–1984

Monkman was replaced as Sky's keyboard player by Steve Gray. Like most of the other band members, Gray was an established session musician who had previously played with Back Door, Quincy Jones, Henry Mancini, Michel Legrand, Lalo Schifrin, Peggy Lee, Sammy Davis Jr and John Barry: more recently he had led WASP (a studio-based jazz-fusion band specialising in high-quality library music). Despite his initial reluctance to return to playing live, Gray was persuaded to join the band in time for their first European tour. This was followed by another UK tour and (on 24 February 1981) the "Sky at Westminster Abbey" concert. A benefit show to commemorate the 20th anniversary of human rights organisation Amnesty International, the latter was conceived by British producer Martin Lewis and was the first-ever rock concert held at the abbey. The landmark event resulted in Sky receiving considerable positive media coverage: it was also videotaped for a BBC TV special and subsequently released on home video and laserdisc.

The Westminster Abbey concert was also the launch event for the band's third album, Sky 3. A generally brighter and breezier album than its predecessors, the record demonstrated Steve Gray's new and prominent compositional role within Sky, moving away from the harpsichordal and psychedelic elements of the Monkman years and taking the band towards a more jazz-influenced sound. Sky went on to tour Australia, Europe and the UK in support of the release.

The fourth Sky album, Sky 4: Forthcoming, was released in March 1982. Sky's first album to feature no original material, it consisted predominantly of arrangements of classical compositions and was marketed under the slogan "Genius Past, Genius Forthcoming". Once again, the band toured the UK and Australia to promote the album (and followed this up with trips to Europe and Japan). The Australian autumn tour featured the debut of plenty of new material, much of which was included on a live double album, Sky Five Live, released in January 1983.

Sky released their sixth album, Cadmium, in December 1983. The album contained a classical-rock arrangement of Prokofiev's "Sleigh Ride" (from the "Lieutenant Kijé Suite"), alongside seven original compositions. It also featured the first examples of commissioned compositions from contemporary writers from outside the band: Alan Tarney (Kevin Peek's old friend and fellow Cliff Richard collaborator) provided two further original tunes. Two concerts at the Theatre Royal, Drury Lane, London were filmed and broadcast on Christmas Eve, 1983, with songwriter and singer-songwriter Patrick Ros as special guest. Ros provided three seasonal compositions of his own on which he was backed by the band.

Having previously hinted that his work with Sky had been intended as a five-year stint, John Williams parted company with the band in February 1984, returning to a full-time classical career. As with Monkman, Williams' departure was amicable. However, it damaged Sky's profile since (despite the band's collective efforts to present themselves as a partnership of equals) the guitarist had remained Sky's biggest star and live draw. The band released a stopgap "greatest hits" compilation called Masterpieces, released on mass-media label Telstar (and featuring a previously unreleased live version of the Beatles song "The Fool on the Hill", performed as a classical guitar duet by Williams and Peek).

Third line-up: 1984–1990

Having opted not to recruit a permanent replacement for Williams, Sky remained as a quartet and opted to tour with a succession of guest musicians. Both of the band's 1984 tours, Australia in February and the UK in early summer, featured session guitarist Lee Fothergill (an accomplished all-round musician who had first met Tristan Fry as part of the house band for 'The Val Doonican Show') and woodwind player Ron Aspery (Steve Gray's former mentor in both Back Door and the Middlesbrough Municipal Junior Orchestra).
 
In September 1984, Sky began recording their seventh album, The Great Balloon Race, in Kevin Peek's Tracks Studio in Western Australia. During the mixing stage, the band learnt that they had been dropped by Ariola Records. The album was eventually released on Epic Records (coincidentally, also the label releasing John Williams' albums) in April 1985. The Great Balloon Race was the first Sky album to feature entirely original material without any classical content, although two pieces ("Allegro" and "Caldando") were strongly classically inspired. Guests included Aspery, Fothergill, pan-pipe player Adrian Brett and former Jeff Beck Band keyboard player Tony Hymas (who contributed the unusual semi-spoken album opener "Desperate For Your Love"). During April and May 1985, Sky toured the UK to promote the record, again performing with guest players – Nicky Hopkins (better known as keyboard player for the Rolling Stones) and multi-instrumentalist Paul Hart (a former composer for the National Youth Jazz Orchestra who had also played with John Dankworth and Cleo Laine).

Despite some favourable reviews, sales of The Great Balloon Race were significantly lower than they had been for previous recordings, and the tour saw Sky playing to smaller audiences than on previous tours. From mid-1985 to 1986, the members of the band worked on other projects. Sky returned in 1987 with another Australian tour (titled "A New Journey"), this time featuring former Yes keyboard player Rick Wakeman in the guest musician slot.

For the rest of 1987, the core quartet worked on the Mozart album, which united the band with the orchestra of the Academy of St Martin in the Fields. The project was initiated by Tristan Fry (due to his parallel work with both band and orchestra) and was inspired by the bicentenary of Mozart's death. The album contained full orchestral performances of Mozart's work with Sky incorporated into the arrangements (most of which were written by Steve Gray). The band and orchestra (with Paul Hart returning as guest musician) promoted the album with a one-off concert at the Royal Albert Hall on 1 November 1987. Although the album ultimately became Sky's most successful album in the United States, Mozart was roundly panned and dismissed by the press and the band took another two years off. A second compilation album, Classic Sky, was released in 1990.

Final years: 1990–1995

When Sky returned to action in 1990, they had become a quintet again, having recruited Paul Hart as a full member. A skilled performer on a variety of instruments (including piano, keyboards, guitars, bass, mandolin, cello and violin), Hart had already proved his worth on the Great Balloon Race and Mozart concerts, broadening and reinforcing the band's sound.

The revived band played a one-off concert at the London Palladium on 24 June 1990, in part to promote the new Sky: Masterpieces compilation. Although the album did not contain any new recordings, the band were still creatively active. At the concert, new compositions by Paul Hart ("Reverie" and "Praeludium") and Kevin Peek ("Jehad") were premiered, alongside a revisiting of Francis Monkman's "Cannonball" (from the debut Sky album) and "Would You Say I'm In Love With You", a piece written by Herbie Flowers with his former Blue Mink colleague Roger Cook. The concert set was later recorded in the studio and also broadcast on television in 1991 as part of the Bedrock concert series on Central TV.

None of this work, however, made it to a studio-recorded album; and in 1991 Kevin Peek became the next member of the band to depart. A full-time resident of Australia since 1982 and busy with multiple recording projects at Tracks Studio (all of which inhibited his practical ability to spend time in the UK working with Sky), he no longer believed that he had enough time to commit to the band.

Peek was replaced by classical/cross-discipline guitarist Richard Durrant (an associate of Herbie Flowers). Durrant joined the band in time for a comeback concert in September 1992 at the Barbican in London. However, although Sky toured the UK again during spring 1993, they were playing notably smaller venues than they had in the 1980s. As gaps in band activity grew longer, and audiences shrank, the group's remaining momentum was gradually lost.

The last performance by Sky was at an RAF tribute concert in May 1995. Although the band never formally disbanded, Sky has never since returned to active recording and performance. The subsequent deaths of Steve Gray (in 2008) and Kevin Peek (in 2013) make a future reunion unlikely.

After Sky: individual careers and recordings

Since leaving Sky in 1980, Francis Monkman has divided his time between experimental rock music, library music and classical music recordings of solo keyboard work (generally harpsichord or church organ). 

Following his own departure from Sky in 1984, John Williams continued his original career as one of the world's leading classical guitarists. He would also commission two guitar concertos from other members of Sky, performing and recording Paul Hart's "Concerto For Guitar & Jazz Orchestra" with the National Youth Jazz Orchestra in 1987, and Steve Gray's "Guitar Concerto" with the London Symphony Orchestra in 1989 (although the latter was not released on record until 1996).

After leaving Sky in 1991, Kevin Peek continued to work as a musician and producer in Australia. In his later years, he underwent two bankruptcies, the first of which resulted in a three-year prison sentence. In 2010 he was linked to a "Ponzi" style investment scheme. In November 2011 he was back in court, bailed on 227 charges of gaining benefit by fraud: a trial date was scheduled for 27 January 2012, but abandoned due to Peek's ill health. He died in Perth, Western Australia, on 11 February 2013, from metastatic skin cancer.

Following Sky's last known collaborative work in 1995, Steve Gray continued his career as a respected composer (which he had been carrying out in parallel to his work with Sky). His compositions include two operas, a requiem mass for jazz big band and choir, the guitar concerto for John Williams and the LSO, and a piano concerto written for French jazz pianist Martial Solal. Gray also provided a full orchestration of the works of Brian Eno (in collaboration with the original composer). From 1991, he worked closely with the North German Radio (NDR) Big Band in Hamburg (at the invitation of singer and composer Norma Winstone) and from 1998 he worked as guest professor of composition and arrangement in the Hanns Eisler jazz department of Berlin Hochschule für Musik. Steve Gray died on 20 September 2008.

Post-Sky, Tristan Fry continued his work as a classical percussionist. He still works with the Orchestra of the Academy of St Martin in the Fields, as well as the Tristan Fry Percussion Ensemble.

As well as branching out as a light entertainment raconteur, Herbie Flowers continues to work as a high-profile session musician and has collaborated with Jools Holland, Clannad, Mike Hatchard and Paul McCartney. He also played in the band for the first live tour of Jeff Wayne's War of the Worlds show (having performed on the original studio album) and again in 2018. He frequently collaborates with Sky's final guitarist, Richard Durrant, on various musical projects (including a trio with former Gentle Giant drummer Malcolm Mortimore). 

Richard Durrant has continued to develop his own career as a classical guitarist, as well as composing film and television music and working as a record producer (notably for the Ukulele Orchestra of Great Britain). Durrant is also the founder of the acoustic record label LongMan Records.

Paul Hart went on to a career in film, television and commercial music and has written concert music for the London Symphony Orchestra, the Royal Philharmonic Orchestra and the King's Singers. His Concerto for Classical Guitar and Jazz Orchestra was revived for performance in 2008 by the Towson University Jazz Orchestra and guitarist Michael Decker.

In 2002, a live Sky album, Live in Nottingham, was released on Classic Rock Productions, drawing on the 1990 live-in-the-studio concert with the Peek/Flowers/Gray/Fry/Hart line-up, which had followed the band's lone Palladium concert in the same year. In 2005, Quantum Leap Productions issued a live DVD, Live in Bremen, featuring the original Sky line-up and recorded at a German television show in either 1979 or 1980.

Personnel

Members
 Herbie Flowers – bass guitar, double-bass, tuba (1978–1995)
 Tristan Fry – drums, percussion, trumpet (1978–1995)
 John Williams – guitars (1978–1984)
 Francis Monkman – harpsichord, synthesisers, organ, guitars (1978–1980)
 Kevin Peek – guitars (1978–1991; died 2013)
 Steve Gray – keyboards, saxophone (1980–1995; died 2008)
 Paul Hart – keyboards, guitars, mandolin, cello (1990–1995)
 Richard Durrant – guitars (1992–1995)

Timeline

Discography

Sky (1979)
Sky 2 (1980)
Sky 3 (1981)
Sky 4: Forthcoming (1982)
Cadmium (1983)
The Great Balloon Race (1985)
Mozart (1987)

Reissues 
In 1993, Arista reissued the band's first five albums on CD, although cuts were made to certain albums to suit CD running times (a shorter edit of "Scipio" on Sky 2 and the complete removal of the twenty-minute suite "The Animals" from Sky Five Live). [The complete "Sky Five Live", with "The Animals", was issued as a double CD on Esoldun, with four bonus tracks from the four earlier studio albums. These were "Carillon" (Sky, listed as "Carillion"), "Toccata" (Sky 2), "Westwind" (Sky 3) and "Fantasia" (Sky 4).]

In 2001, the band began a reissue programme of their back catalogue on Sanctuary Records, beginning with the Anthology compilation album. After four years wait, Sky reissued their debut album on the label in 2005 (with Sky 2 following on a different label, Castle Music). After this the reissues plan stalled (although occasional brief runs of the first two Sky albums would appear intermittently on small labels). It would be nine more years before a full Sky reissue programme was carried out properly.

The entire Sky back catalogue was eventually reissued by Esoteric Recordings (a progressive-rock-friendly subsidiary of Cherry Red Records). On 27 October 2014, fully remastered versions of Sky and Sky 2 were released as CD/DVD packages, each containing a DVD of Sky's television appearances (in 1979 and 1980 respectively). Remastered versions of Sky 3 and Sky 4: Forthcoming were released on 26 January 2015, each with new sleevenote essays and companion live DVDs (the former featuring a companion DVD of the Sky at Westminster Abbey concert, the latter featuring the band's July 1982 live set for the BBC TV programme Night Music). Remastered versions of The Great Balloon Race and Mozart followed on 30 March 2015 (with new essays but no bonus DVDs). The reissue set was completed by 27 April 2015 release of the remastered Sky Five Live (as a double CD with new sleevenote essay and with "The Animals" restored to the running order) and Cadmium (as a double set with three bonus tracks, a new sleevenote essay and a DVD combining a previously unreleased BBC recording of Sky at Drury Lane and a rare performance of the piece "Troika" on the Val Doonican Show from December 1983).

References

External links
Richard Sliwa's comprehensive unofficial Sky website

British instrumental musical groups
Crossover (music)
British progressive rock groups